The 2009–10 Montenegrin First Handball League was fourth season of the Montenegrin First League of Men's Handball, Montenegro's premier handball league.

Participants 

Following the propositions of the competition, league had two parts. During the first, there was 14 weeks, and after that, First League was split into two parts. Four best clubs participated in the TOP4 league for champion, and the last four played in relegation league.

The following seven clubs participated in the Montenegrin First League 2009/10.

First part 

During the first part of the season, all members played 14 games. Four best placed teams - Budućnost, Lovćen, Sutjeska and Rudar continued season in the TOP4 league for champion. Other teams were playing league for relegation.

Table of the first part of the season:

TOP4 / relegation league 

At the final phase, RK Budućnost defended their champions title from the last season, without losing a match. Budučnost became the first team ever to finish a season without losing a point
In the relegation league, at the bottom was RK Danilovgrad.

TOP4 League

Relegation League

Summary 

 Promotion to the EHF Champions League - qualifiers 2010/11: Budućnost Podgorica (Budućnost withdraw)
 Promotion to the EHF Cup 2010/11: Lovćen Cetinje
 Promotion to the EHF Challenge Cup 2010/11: Rudar Pljevlja, Budvanska rivijera
 Relegation to the Second League 2010/11: Danilovgrad
 Withdraw from the First League 2010/11: Budućnost Podgorica (due to finances)
 Promotion to the First league 2010/11: Mojkovac

Handball leagues in Montenegro
Hand
Hand
Monte